Dodd Middle School may refer to:
 Dodd Middle School in Cheshire, Connecticut - Cheshire Public Schools
 John W. Dodd Middle School in Freeport, New York - Freeport Public Schools